This is a list of T-45 Goshawk losses. As of August 2022, about 33 T-45 Goshawks have been destroyed in accidents, or about 15% of the inventory, at a rate of about 1 per year. Interestingly about 1 in 7 losses have been due to bird strikes.

All accidents listed here resulted in the write-off of the aircraft, unless otherwise noted.

Accidents and losses

1990s 
 4 June 1992: The aircraft ran off the runway while landing at Edwards AFB, California
 17 August 1994: Two Goshawks collided 60 miles southwest of NAS Kingsville, Texas, of the 3 pilots 1 did not eject and was killed
 17 March 1996: Pilot attempted an arrested landing at NAS Cecil Field, Jacksonville, Florida, after two tires had been "bulls-eyed" during launch from the USS John F. Kennedy. The pilot safely ejected as the jet swerved uncontrollably towards the left side of the runway.  The plane departed the runway, and flipped over, crushing the canopy.
 1 November 1996: Pilots ejected after a bird strike caused a catastrophic engine failure while in a night landing pattern at NAS Kingsville, Texas. The student was seriously injured when ejected through the canopy due to a jettison failure.
 15 April 1997: Sole pilot ejected after a bird strike caused a catastrophic engine failure on approach to NAS Kingsville, Texas
 11 December 1997: The aircraft splashed after launch from the USS Enterprise off the coast of Georgia, sole pilot rescued
 19 August 1998: The aircraft crashed while attempting a landing on the USS John F. Kennedy 70 miles off Jacksonville, Florida, student pilot killed

2000s 
 21 February 2001: Two pilots were killed while performing safety observer duties 1 mile from the USS Dwight D. Eisenhower, off Mayport, Florida
 24 February 2004: Student pilot crashed onto the runway at NAS Meridian, Mississippi, during touch-and-go landing, survived
 12 July 2004: A student pilot ran off the runway during landing at NAS Meridian, Mississippi, ejected and survived
 22 March 2005: The aircraft crashed while turning in the landing pattern during a field carrier landing practice flight at NAS Meridian, Mississippi, the lone pilot was killed
 11 May 2005: The aircraft crashed on approach to NAS Kingsville, Texas, sole pilot ejected safely
 27 October 2005: The aircraft crashed at NAS Kingsville, Texas, not fatal
 31 October 2005: A Goshawk crashed 1.5 miles northeast of NAS Kingsville, Texas, both pilots ejected with minor injuries
 27 September 2007: The aircraft crashed about 13 miles west of NAS Kingsville, Texas, after a bird strike, student pilot ejected with minor injuries
 1 October 2007: The aircraft crashed 2 miles north of NAS Kingsville, Texas, after a bird strike, both pilots safely ejected
 4 March 2008: Two pilots ejected while on approach to NAS Meridian, Mississippi, after declaring an emergency
 20 May 2008: Two pilots ejected during a touch and go landing at NAS Meridian, Mississippi, after a technical failure

2010s 
 10 June 2010: The aircraft ran off the end of the runway at NAS Kingsville, Texas, the sole pilot safely ejected but the aircraft was not written off
 29 December 2010: Two pilots ejected with minor injuries 14 miles southeast of Tallahassee Regional Airport after major problems developed
 15 June 2011: The aircraft crashed about 55 miles northwest of NAS Kingsville, Texas, student pilot ejected with minor injuries
 2 November 2011: The aircraft crashed shortly after takeoff from NAS Kingsville, Texas, both pilots ejected safely, aircraft not written off
 30 May 2012: A Goshawk crashed in a rural area of Brooks County 42 miles southwest of NAS Kingsville, Texas, both pilots ejected safely
 4 November 2013: A Goshawk crashed on the runway at NAS Pensacola, Florida. while landing, both pilots were injured
 22 May 2015: The aircraft overran the runway at NAS North Island, San Diego, California, and crashed into the water, pilot ejected safely
 14 August 2016: The aircraft crashed 17 miles southwest of NAS Kingsville during a night instrument flight, both pilots ejected safely, one with minor injuries
 7 September 2016: The aircraft crashed after a technical malfunction, both pilots ejected safely
 17 January 2017: The Goshawk crashed on the runway at NAS Meridian, Mississippi, after a bird strike, both pilots ejected safely
 1 October 2017: Two pilots were killed in a crash of a Goshawk near Tellico Plains, Tennessee. Investigators blamed aggressive and unsafe behaviors by the instructor pilot and the student naval aviator.
 10 May 2019: Both pilots ejected with minor injuries after engine failure on takeoff at NAS Kingsville, Texas

2020s 

 24 March 2021: A T-45C crashed approximately 3 miles northeast of Naval Outlying Field Orange Grove, Texas with no fatalities after an unforeseeable hydraulic failure.
 17 May 2021: Two Goshawks collided in midair over Ricardo, Texas. One plane landed safely, the two pilots of the other aircraft ejected safely, one with minor injuries.
 19 September 2021: A T-45C crashed into a residential neighborhood in Lake Worth, Texas, about 2 miles away from NAS JRB Fort Worth, damaging at least 3 homes and injuring 5, including the student pilot and instructor, one pilot became entangled in power lines. It was later determined that the jet experienced a bird strike while on approach.
 17 August 2022: A Goshawk crashed into an empty field while on approach to NAS Kingsville, Texas. The single crew member, an instructor, safely ejected.

Citations

External links 
Aviation Safety Network - BAe Hawk (including T-45 Goshawk)

Lists of accidents and incidents involving military aircraft